Eleutherodactylus pipilans is a species of frog in the family Eleutherodactylidae. It is found in southern and southeastern Mexico (south-central Guerrero to southern Oaxaca to southern Chiapas) and southwestern Guatemala.

Taxonomy
Two subspecies are sometimes recognized:
 Eleutherodactylus pipilans pipilans
 Eleutherodactylus pipilans nebulosus
E. p. nebulosus was first described as a separate species, but became treated as a subspecies by Duellman in 1958. Common name nebulous chirping frog refers to this subspecies, whereas common name whistling chirping frog may either refer to the species as a whole or the nominotypical subspecies E. p. pipilans. The subspecies differ in relative tympanum size and coloration.

Description
Adult males measure  and females  in snout–vent length. Skin of the dorsum is smooth or shagreened. The eyes are relatively large. The tympanum is visible and oval in shape. The arms are long while the legs are relatively short. The dorsal background color is dark brown to slightly lighter brown. There are yellow, orange, light brown, or greenish blotches or spots. The limbs are banded.  Males have vocal slits.

Habitat and conservation
Individuals are found in a range of microhabitats: on the rocks, on the ground, under rocks and debris, and in a cave. Although locally abundant and tolerating some habitat modification, it is threatened by habitat loss.

References

pipilans
Amphibians of Guatemala
Amphibians of Mexico
Taxa named by Edward Harrison Taylor
Amphibians described in 1940
Taxonomy articles created by Polbot